SIES (Nerul) College of Arts, Science and Commerce, popularly known as SIES Nerul, is a college in Nerul, Navi Mumbai, India. The college is a South Indian linguistic minority institution.

College Departments 
SIES Nerul has the following departments:
Accounting & Finance
Banking & Insurance
Commerce & Allied Subjects
Computer Science
Economics
Environmental Science
Information Technology
Management Studies
Multimedia & Mass Communication

References

External links 

 Official Website

Education in Navi Mumbai
Universities and colleges in Mumbai
Educational institutions established in 1998
1998 establishments in Maharashtra